The Ptychochrominae are a subfamily in the cichlid family of fish. It includes about 14 species. They are restricted to lakes and rivers in Madagascar, and the majority are threatened. Most cichlid genera native to Madagascar are included in this subfamily; the only exceptions are Paretroplus (subfamily Etroplinae) and Paratilapia (sometimes included in the Ptychochrominae, but likely belongs in its own subfamily).

Genera
The following genera are included in the subfamily Ptychochrominae:
Katria Stiassny & Sparks, 2006
Oxylapia Kiener & Maugé, 1966
Paratilapia Bleeker, 1868 
Ptychochromis Steindachner, 1880
Ptychochromoides Kiener & Maugé, 1966

References

 
Cichlid fish of Africa

Fish subfamilies
Cichlidae